The 1981 Long Beach State 49ers football team represented California State University, Long Beach during the 1981 NCAA Division I-A football season.

Cal State Long Beach competed in the Pacific Coast Athletic Association. The team was led by fifth-year head coach Dave Currey, and played home games at Anaheim Stadium in Anaheim, California. They finished the season with a record of two wins, eight losses (2–8, 1–4 PCAA).

Schedule

Team players in the NFL
The following were selected in the 1982 NFL Draft.

Notes

References

Long Beach State
Long Beach State 49ers football seasons
Long Beach State 49ers football